Rymanów (or) is a town located in the Subcarpathian Voivodeship, in the southeastern tip of Poland, with 3,585 inhabitants. It is a capital of a separate commune within Krosno County.

History 

The town was built by the Duke of Silesia Władysław of Opole, the local representative of king Louis I of Hungary. Initially the town was named Ladisslavia, after the founder, and was inhabited primarily by settlers of central Germany (Reimannshau), largely overpopulated in late Middle Ages. In 1376 the town received a city charter based on the Magdeburg Law, which granted the town with a significant level self-government. During the reign of Ladislaus I of Poland the town received the modern name of Rymanów, after the first wójt Nicolao Reymann. The town was located on the traditional trade routes leading through the Carpathians to Hungary and in the 15th and 16th centuries it received numerous privileges from various Polish monarchs. This created a boost for local economy, mostly centred on the weekly fairs organized there. The period of prosperity ended in the 17th century, when this part of Poland was repeatedly pillaged and plundered by the invading armies during the wars against Muscovy, Sweden, Turkey and the Khmelnytsky Uprising.
Throughout the ages, the town's history was interwoven with the fate of several notable Polish szlachta families. In 17th and 18th century the town was a private property of the Stadnicki family. In 1731 Teresa Stadnicka married Józef Kanty Ossoliński and the town passed to the mighty Ossoliński family, notable for their collections of books and pieces of art. The latter started the construction of an exceptional parochial church, finished by his daughter Anna Teresa. The latter in 1794 sold the town to Potocki family, who owned it until the 20th century.

The town since the 16th century had also a significant Jewish population, a synagogue is already mentioned in 1593, during a criminal trial at the castle court in Sanok. The local 17th century Bejt-ha-kneset synagogue is one of the exceptional examples of unusual fortified Jewish houses of prayer, used both for religious and military purposes. The local kirkut (established in the 16th century) survived World War II and currently features ca. 800 graves. Among them are tombs of some of the most renown local Jews, including tsadikkim Menachem Mendl, Cwi Hirsch, Józef Friedman and cantor Israel Schorr. There is also a small military cemetery for Jewish soldiers who perished in the fights for the town in 1914 and 1915.

In the 19th century, after the partitions of Poland, the town was annexed by Austria and was made part of the Austrian-ruled Galicia. Initially a part of the Land of Sanok of the Ruthenian Voivodeship, in 1772 it became a part of the Circle of Lesko and in 1864 back to the starostship of Sanok. The town's economy gradually got back on track as it became a local centre of foodstuffs trade for the local peasants. In 1872 the town became the property of Stanisław Potocki and his wife Anna Działyńska, who started to develop a local spa. Much like the nearby town of Iwonicz Zdrój, Rymanów quickly developed into a popular resort for the inhabitants of Lwów. With the beginning of oil industry in nearby Borysław, a new railway was built only half a mile from the city. This further boosted the local development. In 1898 the town had 3704, including 1889 Poles and 1751 Jews. It had a post office, train station, telegraph and a gymnasium. However, after the outbreak of World War I the town was captured by the Russian Empire in September 1914 and severely looted. The spa pavillons were burnt to the ground and the town suffered from several weeks of Russian rule. In 1915 it was again retaken by Austria-Hungary and started to be rebuilt.

After Poland regained her independence in 1918, the town was restored to Poland. However, 20 years afterwards the town was again damaged, this time during the German terror bombings during the Polish Defensive War. After the Polish defeat, a prisoner of war camp was set up in the town's vicinity. Up to 10,000 Soviet prisoners were killed there by the Germans. The camp served also as a transit camp for the Jewish population.

During the German occupation, the Germans immediately robbed and terrorized Rymanów's Jewish population of around 1400.  They were forced into a ghetto near the center of town, living with other refugees from neighboring towns, and some were forced into the prisoner of war camp.  In August 1942, about 200 men were sent to labor camps, while many women, children, and the ill were rounded up and shot on the spot.  The elderly were taken to the woods near Dukla and shot there.  The rest were loaded on trains and sent to Belzec where they were murdered.  The 400 or so Jews who survived the war were mostly those who fled to the Soviet Union when the Germans invaded though some were hidden locally by Christian acquaintances.  The mass murder actions were typical of the fate of Jews in Polish towns and villages during the Holocaust except that many more of Rymanow's Jews survived than was typical.

Articles

Image Gallery

Notable people

 Robert Biedroń (born 1976), politician and LGBT activist
 Menachem Mendel of Rimanov (1745–1815), Hasidic rebbe and author
 Józef Kanty Ossoliński (1707–1780), magnate in the Polish–Lithuanian Commonwealth
 Isidor Isaac Rabi (1898–1988), winner of the 1944 Nobel Prize in Physics
 Israel Schorr (1886-1935), prominent hazzan
 Edith Schreiber-Aujame (1919-1998), architect
 Tomasz Wacek (born 1976), footballer

See also 
 Walddeutsche
 List of Hasidic dynasties
 Rebbe Menachem Mendel of Rimanov
 Rimenov (Hasidic dynasty)

External links 
 Official website of Rymanow
 Website of Rymanow Zdroj
 Rymanów

References

Notes
  Other early names of the town mentioned in various sources include: Ladisslaulia, Laslaw (1413),Reimannshau,  Rymanów(1415), Rimanow (1423), Rymanów (1433) and Rimanowo'' (1485), source Prof. Adam Fastnacht - Slownik Historyczno-Geograficzny Ziemi Sanockiej w Sredniowieczu, Krakau 2002,

Footnotes

Shtetls
Cities and towns in Podkarpackie Voivodeship
Krosno County
Nazi war crimes in Poland
Holocaust locations in Poland

it:Rymanów